Łukasz Skrzyński  (born January 31, 1978 in Skawina) is a former Polish defender who last played for Polish side Zawisza Bydgoszcz.

Career

Club
In July 2011, he joined Zawisza Bydgoszcz.

References

External links
 

1978 births
Living people
Polish footballers
Wisła Kraków players
Korona Kielce players
Proszowianka Proszowice players
MKS Cracovia (football) players
Polonia Warsaw players
Zawisza Bydgoszcz players
People from Skawina
Sportspeople from Lesser Poland Voivodeship
Association football defenders